Kathryn Moira Beaton (born 8 September 1983) is a Canadian comics artist best known as the creator of the comic strip Hark! A Vagrant, which ran from 2007 to 2018. Her other major works include the children's books The Princess and the Pony and King Baby, published in 2015 and 2016 respectively. The former was made into an Apple TV+ series called Pinecone & Pony released in 2022 on which Beaton worked as an executive producer. Also in 2022, Beaton released a memoir in graphic novel form, Ducks: Two Years in the Oil Sands, about her experience working in the Alberta oil sands. Publishers Weekly named Ducks one of their top ten books of the year.

Early life
Of Scottish descent, Beaton grew up with her three sisters in Mabou on the isle of Cape Breton. She went to a small school for K–12, only having 23 people in her class. She graduated from Mount Allison University in 2005 with a Bachelor of Arts in history and anthropology.
Beaton began drawing comics for the university newspaper, The Argosy, during her third and fourth years at school. After college, she worked as an administrative assistant in the Maritime Museum of British Columbia in Victoria.

Career
After graduating from Mount Allison in 2005 Beaton worked at an oil sands mining project in Fort McMurray to pay off her student loans.
In 2007, while still working at the Maritime Museum of BC, Beaton decided to publish some of her history-inspired comics on the Web. She posted comics to a new website, katebeaton.com, and to a LiveJournal blog. In December of that year, she published the first of two popular batches of history-themed comic strips, whose subjects were ones suggested by at least twenty of her readers. 

Beaton published her webcomic, Hark! A Vagrant, from 2007 to 2018. She moved her work from LiveJournal to her new website, also titled Hark! A Vagrant, in May 2008. Its subjects included historical figures, such as James Joyce and Ada Lovelace, or fictional characters from Western literature. In several comics, Beaton caricatured herself, past and present.  Beaton has a simple artistic style, with particular attention to detail paid to her characters' facial expressions; her skill at comic pacing has also been noted. Hark! A Vagrant won the 2011 Ignatz Award for Outstanding Online Comic.

Beaton's work has been profiled in Wired, Maclean's, and Comic Book Resources. "The Origin of Man", her comic celebrating Charles Darwin's 200th birthday, was showcased by MySpace Dark Horse Presents in March 2009. In June 2009, she released a book titled Never Learn Anything from History. Several of her cartoons have been published in The New Yorker. Drawn & Quarterly released her second book, also titled Hark! A Vagrant, in September 2011. Time magazine named it one of the top ten fiction books of the year, with Lev Grossman calling it "the wittiest book of the year."

Beaton's self-published Never Learn Anything from History won the 2009 Doug Wright Award for Best Emerging Talent. Hark! A Vagrant won the 2011 Harvey Award for Best Online Comics Work, having been nominated the previous year, and was also nominated for Joe Shuster Awards in 2009 and 2010. Beaton followed up her 2011 Harvey win by taking home three Harveys in 2012, for Humor, Online Work, and Best Cartoonist.

She is a former member of Pizza Island, a cartoonist's studio in Greenpoint, Brooklyn which was formed by herself and cartoonists Lisa Hanawalt, Domitille Collardey, Sarah Glidden, Meredith Gran, and Julia Wertz.

Beaton has contributed to Marvel Comics' Strange Tales anthology. In 2014, Beaton uploaded the five-part webcomic Ducks, which presents a more serious and complex story based on Beaton's experiences working at a remote mining site in Canada.

Step Aside, Pops, a collection of her Hark! A Vagrant comics, topped The New York Times graphic novel bestseller list in October 2015. In a 2015 poll, Beaton ranked fourteenth among the top all-time female comics artists.

Beaton's first children's book, The Princess and the Pony, was released in 2015. In 2016, she published the picture book King Baby.

In October 2018, Beaton ended the ongoing serialization of her webcomic, saying, "I feel like this is a project that has run its course."

In 2022, an animated TV series based on Kate Beaton's The Princess and the Pony, called Pinecone & Pony, was released on the streaming service Apple TV+, with Beaton serving as executive producer.

In September 2022, Beaton released a memoir in graphic novel form called Ducks: Two Years in the Oil Sands, which documented her experience working in the energy extraction industry for Alberta oil sands before she became a cartoonist. It expanded on her earlier 2014 webcomic Ducks. The book was selected for the 2023 edition of Canada Reads, where it will be championed by Mattea Roach.<ref>"Meet the Canada Reads 2023 contenders". CBC Books, January 25, 2023.</ref>

The American Library Association listed Ducks among their top ten in the 2022 Best Graphic Novels for Adults list. 

Personal life
She is married to Morgan Murray, a writer whose debut novel Dirty Birds was published in 2020. She has two children. After living in New York and Toronto, Beaton now lives in Nova Scotia with her family.

Awards

|-
| 2009
| Hark! A Vagrant| Doug Wright Award for Best Emerging Talent
| 
| 
|-
| 2009
| Hark! A Vagrant| Joe Shuster Awards
| 
| 
|-
| 2010
| Hark! A Vagrant| Joe Shuster Awards
| 
| 
|-
| 2010
| Hark! A Vagrant 
| Harvey Award for Best Online Comics Work
| 
| 
|-
| 2010
| Never Learn Anything From History 
| Doug Wright Award for The Pigskin Peters Award
| 
| 
|-
| 2011
| Hark! A Vagrant 
| Ignatz Award for Outstanding Online Comic
| 
| 
|-
| 2012
| Hark! A Vagrant 
| Harvey Award for Best Online Comics Work
| 
| 
|-
| 2012
| Hark! A Vagrant 
| Harvey Award Special Award for Humor in Comics
| 
| 
|-
| 2012
| Hark! A Vagrant 
| Harvey Award for Best Cartoonist
| 
| 
|-
| 2012
| Hark! A Vagrant 
| Doug Wright Award for Best Book
| 
| 
|-
| 2016
| Step Aside, Pops: A Hark! A Vagrant Collection| Eisner Award for Best Humor Publication
| 
| 
|-
| 2016
| The Princess and The Pony| CBC Children's Choice Book Award: Illustrator
| 
| 
|-
| 2016
| The Princess and The Pony| E.B. White Read-Aloud Book Award: Picture Book
| 
| 
|-
| 2016
| King Baby| NAPPA Awards
| 
| 
|-
| 2016
| Step Aside, Pops: A Hark! A Vagrant Collection 
| Doug Wright Award for Best Book
| 
| 

 Bibliography 

 Comic collections 
 Never Learn Anything From History (2009)
 Hark! A Vagrant (Montréal: Drawn & Quarterly, 2011)
 Step Aside, Pops (Montréal: Drawn & Quarterly, 2015)

 Children's books 
 The Princess and the Pony (New York, NY: Arthur A. Levine Books, an imprint of Scholastic Inc., 2015)
 King Baby (New York, NY: Arthur A. Levine Books, an imprint of Scholastic Inc., 2016)

 Non-fiction 
 Ducks: Two Years in the Oil Sands'' (Montréal: Drawn & Quarterly, 2022)

References

External links 

 Hark! A Vagrant Comics by K. Beaton
 

1983 births
Living people
Alternative cartoonists
Artists from Nova Scotia
Canadian cartoonists
Canadian children's writers
Canadian comics writers
Canadian emigrants to the United States
Canadian female comics artists
Canadian humorists
Canadian people of Scottish descent
Canadian webcomic creators
Canadian women cartoonists
Canadian women children's writers
Doug Wright Award winners for Best Emerging Talent
Female comics writers
Harvey Award winners
Ignatz Award winners for Outstanding Anthology or Collection
Ignatz Award winners for Outstanding Online Comic
Mount Allison University alumni
The New Yorker cartoonists
Women humorists